Greers Ferry is a city in Cleburne County, Arkansas, United States. The population was 891 at the 2010 census.

Geography
Greers Ferry is located in western Cleburne County at  (35.575588, -92.164042). It is situated on the east side of Greers Ferry Lake, overlooking The Narrows portion of the lake. Arkansas Highways 16 and 92 cross The Narrows, connecting the city of Greers Ferry with Higden on the west side of the lake. Highway 16, heading north, crosses the northern arm of the lake via the Edgemont Bridge, leading to Fairfield Bay.

Demographics

2020 census

As of the 2020 United States census, there were 821 people, 451 households, and 330 families residing in the city.

2000 census
As of the census of 2000, there were 930 people, 398 households, and 300 families residing in the city. The racial makeup of the city was 97.31% White, 0.11% Black or African American, 0.11% Native American, 0.22% Asian, 0.22% from other races, and 2.04% from two or more races.  1.18% of the population were Hispanic or Latino of any race.

There were 398 households, out of which 24.6% had children under the age of 18 living with them, 65.3% were married couples living together, 7.0% had a female householder with no husband present, and 24.4% were non-families. 21.1% of all households were made up of individuals, and 11.6% had someone living alone who was 65 years of age or older.  The average household size was 2.34 and the average family size was 2.65.

In the city, the population was spread out, with 20.3% under the age of 18, 5.1% from 18 to 24, 21.3% from 25 to 44, 26.6% from 45 to 64, and 26.8% who were 65 years of age or older.  The median age was 48 years. For every 100 females, there were 99.6 males.  For every 100 females age 18 and over, there were 96.0 males.

The median income for a household in the city was $30,238, and the median income for a family was $32,344. Males had a median income of $24,200 versus $16,250 for females. The per capita income for the city was $16,496.  About 12.0% of families and 16.0% of the population were below the poverty line, including 26.4% of those under age 18 and 8.2% of those age 65 or over.

Education 
Greers Ferry is home to the West Side School District, West Side Elementary School and West Side High School.

References

External links
Greers Ferry Chamber of Commerce

Cities in Cleburne County, Arkansas
Cities in Arkansas